Wembley Central  may refer to:
Wembley Central (ward)
Wembley Central Square
Wembley Central station